Eupen is a railway station in Eupen, Liège, Belgium.  The station opened on 1 March 1864 on the Line 49. The train services are operated by NMBS/SNCB.

Train services
The following service currently serve the station:

Intercity services (IC-01) Ostend - Bruges - Gent - Brussels - Leuven - Liege - Welkenraedt - Eupen

References

Railway stations in Belgium
Railway stations in Liège Province
Railway stations opened in 1864
Buildings and structures in the German-speaking Community of Belgium
Eupen